Eastern Suburbs (now known as the Sydney Roosters) competed in the New South Wales Rugby League (NSWRL) premiership in 1954.

Details
 Lineup - Ray Armstrong, Ferris Ashton(Capt-Coach), John Bell, Ron Booth, Danny Byrnes, Kevin Byrne, Ray Chadwick, Ray Christopher, Charlie Cooksley, Kevin Clark, W.Dowsley, Kevin Doyle, Terry Fearnley, Jack Gibson, Ken Hunter, Ray Hyde, Tommy Kaine, Frank Lawrence, H.Lewis, R.Maloney, K.McDonald, Frank Murphy, Paul Plyers, Barry Russell, K.Small, Fred Smith, Ron Sudlow, Alan Wilson.

Ladder

Season summary

 1954 saw the introduction of the famous Eastern Suburbs 'v' style of jersey which was modeled on the French design.
 One of the few highlights of the year was beating traditional rivals and eventual competition winners South Sydney 26-25 in round 6.

References

External links
Rugby League Tables and Statistics

Sydney Roosters seasons
Eastern Suburbs season